Antonijo Peševski (born 23 December 1990) is a Macedonian handball player who played  for RK Metalurg Skopje.

References
http://www.eurohandball.com/ec/cl/men/2015-16/player/542281/AntonijoPeshevski

1990 births
Living people
Macedonian male handball players
Sportspeople from Skopje